is a junction passenger railway station located in Nakahara-ku, Kawasaki, Kanagawa Prefecture, Japan, operated by the private railway company Tokyu Corporation.

Lines
Motosumiyoshi Station is served by the Tōkyū Tōyoko Line and is 12.1 kilometers from the starting point of the line at Shibuya. It is also served by the Tōkyū Meguro Line and is 10.4 kilometers from the terminus of that line at Meguro Station.

Station layout
The station consists of two island platforms with six tracks. The outermost tracks 1 and 6 are for through passage of express traffic on the Toyoko Line.

Platforms

History
Motosumiyoshi Station opened as one of the original Tōyoko Line stations on February 14, 1926.  The station was rebuilt as an underground station  (ticket gates were underground and platforms were on the ground) in 1963, but was totally reconstructed in 2006 as an elevated above-ground station.

On February 15, 2014, at around 12:30 a.m., two Tōyoko Line trains collided on the Yokohama-bound track at the station. 19 passengers were lightly injured in the accident. The cause of the accident was supposedly the heavy snow that resulted in lack of braking force.

Passenger statistics
In fiscal 2019, the station was used by an average of 67,853 passengers daily. 

The daily average passenger figures for previous years are as shown below.

Surrounding area
Sumiyoshi Shrine
Kanto Workers' Health and Safety Hospital
Tokyu Corporation Former Sumiyoshi Depot
Tokyu Driving School / Train Driver Training Center
Kanagawa Prefectural Sumiyoshi High School
Hosei University Second Junior and Senior High School

See also
 List of railway stations in Japan

References

External links

 

Railway stations in Kanagawa Prefecture
Railway stations in Japan opened in 1926
Tokyu Toyoko Line
Tokyu Meguro Line
Stations of Tokyu Corporation
Railway stations in Kawasaki, Kanagawa